Husik is a name of Armenian origin, that may refer to:

Husik Santurjan (1920–2011), Armenian archbishop
Isaac Husik (1876–1939) American writer
Lida Husik (born 1963), American musician
St. Husik I (died 347), Armenian religious leader

Jewish surnames
Armenian given names
Yiddish-language surnames